Saint Jerome or Penitent Saint Jerome is a c.1640-1650 oil on canvas painting by Guercino, now in the Royal Palace of Naples.

History
Its origins are unknown - 20th century art critics argue it was commissioned by someone featured in the painter's accounts book. The work dates to 1640–1650, a period when figures from Cento, Ferrara and Bologna were commissioning works from him for sums between around 50 and 67 scudi.

The earliest definite reference to the work dates to 1680, when it was recorded at the Palazzo del Giardino in Parma as part of the Farnese collection, though it is unknown how it entered that collection. In 1734, before being moved to Naples, the Jerome was recorded as being at the Ducal Palace in Parma. When Elisabeth Farnese's son Charles of Bourbon came to the throne of the Two Sicilies, it and the rest of the Farnese collection was moved to Naples. The work was then largely forgotten before being re-evaluated at the end of the 20th century.

References

1640s paintings
Farnese Collection
Paintings by Guercino
Guercino
Paintings in the Royal Palace of Naples